Callicarpa japonica, commonly known as East Asian beautyberry or Japanese beautyberry, is a plant in the mint family.

It is a deciduous shrub, most notable for producing purple drupes (its "berries") in the fall. The flowers can range from pink through white. This species is native to China, Japan, Korea, Ryukyu Islands, and Taiwan. It considered to be a common species in Japan.

It is cultivated as an ornamental bush, and it is very popular in gardens and parks. The fruits are not edible for humans, but are food of birds and deer. The leaves can be used to make herbal tea.

Gallery

References

External links
 Japanese Beautyberry info

japonica
Flora of China
Flora of Eastern Asia
Plants described in 1784